The Prom is a 2020 American musical comedy film directed by Ryan Murphy and adapted to the screen by Chad Beguelin and Bob Martin, from their and Matthew Sklar's 2018 Broadway musical of the same name. The film stars Meryl Streep, James Corden, Nicole Kidman, Keegan-Michael Key, Andrew Rannells, Ariana DeBose, Tracy Ullman, Kevin Chamberlin, Mary Kay Place, Kerry Washington, and introducing Jo Ellen Pellman in her film debut as Emma Nolan.

The Prom had a limited theatrical release on December 4, 2020, prior to streaming on Netflix on December 11, 2020. The film received mixed reviews by critics, who praised the message, musical numbers and ensemble cast, but criticized the narrative and stereotypes, as well as Corden's performance.

Plot

In Edgewater, Indiana at a meeting of the James Madison High School PTA, PTA president Mrs. Greene announces that the school's prom will be canceled because a lesbian student named Emma Nolan wanted to bring a girl to the dance, much to the dismay of Principal Tom Hawkins who supports Emma, but is powerless to oppose the PTA's decision.

Meanwhile in New York City, narcissistic Broadway stars Dee Dee Allen and Barry Glickman are disappointed after their show Eleanor! The Eleanor Roosevelt Story closes on opening night due to the New York Times blasting their performances. They are comforted by Trent Oliver, a Juilliard graduate and former sitcom star who has been reduced to playing forgettable supporting roles, and Angie Dickinson, a vain performer who has just quit her part in the chorus of Chicago after being passed over for the role of Roxie Hart in favor of Tina Louise. Angie and Trent realize that the four of them need a cause to revitalize their careers. After finding Emma's story on Twitter, the actors drive to Indiana with the cast of Godspell and publicist Sheldon Saperstein.

At school, Emma is bullied and harassed by fellow students Kaylee, Shelby, Nick and Kevin, who blame her for ruining prom. The actors barge into the next PTA meeting, where they unsuccessfully attempt to rally support for Emma. Hawkins turns out to be a big fan of Dee Dee's. Emma and her closeted girlfriend Alyssa, Mrs. Greene's daughter, meet in private to discuss when Alyssa should come out to her mother.

The actors get motel rooms and book a gig as the entertainment for a monster truck rally, but are booed off the stage when they use the opportunity to preach about acceptance. Hawkins tells them that the Indiana Supreme Court has ruled that James Madison must allow Emma to attend prom. That evening, he and Dee Dee bond over dinner at an Applebee's.

The next day, a number of s occur and cheerleaders, Kaylee and Shelby find out about Alyssa's plan to come out. Barry visit Emma at the house of her grandmother Bea who reveals that Emma has been living with her since her sixteenth birthday when her parents threw her out for being gay. Barry tells Emma that he ran away from home years ago because he knew his parents would never accept his sexual orientation and has not spoken to them since.

After Emma gets a makeover for the prom, she learns that the PTA has exploited a loophole in the Court's ruling by arranging for her to attend a separate prom alone while the rest of the students go to the real prom at a private club. Emma calls Alyssa for support, but Alyssa admits that she's too scared of losing her mother to come out. Hawkins is disgusted when he learns the real reason that Dee Dee came to Indiana was to use Emma to prop up her career.

The next day, Mrs. Greene holds a press conference about the two proms. Angie comforts a heartbroken Emma, while Barry tries to convince Dee Dee to get Emma on her ex-husband Eddie Sharp's talk show; in response, she insists that he call his mother Vera and make peace with her. Dee Dee apologizes to Hawkins for lying to him and they reconcile while Emma, upset that Alyssa would rather uphold her mother's false image of her than be herself, breaks up with Alyssa.

Trent confronts Emma's tormentors, persuading them to support her with help from the Godspell cast. Dee Dee arrives at the motel and tells everyone she agreed to give Eddie her house in The Hamptons in order to get Emma a slot on his show. However, Emma turns the offer down so she can tell her story her own way and sings a song she wrote during a livestream, which goes viral online.

The actors decide to pool their money to finance an all-inclusive prom for Emma, and Alyssa shows up, inspired by Emma's song to finally come out. Afterward, Dee Dee tells Barry that she called Vera, who wants to talk to him. Vera tells Barry that although she cannot undo what she did to him, she still wants them to have a relationship, and the two finally make up.

Kaylee, Shelby, Nick and Kevin visit the gym to apologize to Alyssa and Emma for their behavior. Mrs. Greene tries to put a stop to preparations for the prom. When Alyssa reveals who she really is, her mother leaves quietly. Alyssa and Emma reconcile.

Later that night, Emma and Alyssa show up early to meet with the actors, Sheldon, Bea, and Vera. Angie learns that she has been cast as Roxie Hart because Tina Louise has contracted shingles, Trent retires from acting to become James Madison's new drama teacher, and Barry is crowned prom queen. The students and many teens from the local LGBT community show up to the prom in support of Emma. As the event begins, Mrs. Greene arrives, apologizes, and embraces Alyssa, accepting her for who she is. Dee Dee and Principal Hawkins share a kiss and start a relationship. Emma and Alyssa finally share a public kiss and everyone celebrates.

Cast

 Meryl Streep as Dee Dee Allen, a narcissistic two-time Tony award-winning Broadway actress.
 James Corden as Barry Glickman, a narcissistic Broadway actor.
 Sam Pillow as a young Barry Glickman
 Nicole Kidman as Angie Dickinson, a chorus girl who has been unable to get a chance to portray Roxie Hart in Chicago.
 Keegan-Michael Key as Principal Tom Hawkins, the principal of James Madison High School.
 Andrew Rannells as Trent Oliver, a Juilliard graduate who is between gigs and starred in the sitcom Talk to the Hand.
 Jo Ellen Pellman as Emma Nolan, a lesbian 17-year-old girl.
 Ariana DeBose as Alyssa Greene, a cheerleader who is Emma's closeted girlfriend. DeBose wore a wig over her natural hair when portraying Alyssa.
 Kerry Washington as Mrs. Greene, Alyssa's mother and the head of Edgewater's PTA.
 Tracey Ullman as Vera Glickman, Barry's mother.
 Kevin Chamberlin as Sheldon Saperstein, Dee Dee and Barry's publicist.
 Mary Kay Place as Grandma Bea, Emma's supportive grandmother who raised her when Emma's parents kicked her out of their house for coming out to them.
 Logan Riley Hassel as Kaylee, Alyssa's cheerleader friend who disapproves of Emma taking a girl to prom and has a small tattoo on her wrist.
 Sofia Deler as Shelby, Alyssa and Kaylee's cheerleader friend who also disapproves of Emma taking a girl to prom and has lost her virginity.
 Nico Greetham as Nick, Kaylee's boyfriend whose parents are divorced.
 Nathaniel J. Potvin as Kevin Shield, Shelby's boyfriend.

Soundtrack

The soundtrack was released digitally on December 4, 2020, by Maisie Music, with a physical release on December 18.

Song list

Production
The film is based on the same premise as the musical of the same name, that uses music by Matthew Sklar, lyrics by Chad Beguelin, and a book by Bob Martin and Beguelin, based on an original concept by Jack Viertel. The film is also loosely based around the 2010 Itawamba County School District prom controversy.

CNN notes the film project is on "theme with Murphy's advocacy for more inclusivity in Hollywood" including his spearheading the 2017 Half Initiative, to "create equal representation for women and minorities behind the camera". Murphy announced plans for the adaptation during a charity performance of the musical at New York's Longacre Theatre in April 2019.

On June 25, 2019, Meryl Streep, James Corden, Andrew Rannells and Nicole Kidman were revealed to be cast as the four leads, with Keegan-Michael Key as the school principal. Ariana Grande was initially cast as Alyssa Greene, a popular but closeted cheerleader and Emma's girlfriend, but scheduling conflicts with the Sweetener World Tour forced Grande to drop out. Kerry Washington was cast in October, with Ariana DeBose joining in November, replacing Grande in the role of Alyssa. Jo Ellen Pellman was also cast as Emma following a nationwide search. Madelaine Petsch also auditioned for Pellman's role. The project is the first film under Murphy's $300 million deal with Netflix, and fifth overall. On January 25, 2020, Awkwafina dropped out of the film due to scheduling conflicts and Kevin Chamberlin was recast as Sheldon Saperstein. On June 25, 2020, Tracey Ullman and Mary Kay Place were revealed to star in the film.

Filming commenced on December 11, 2019, in Los Angeles. On March 12, 2020, production was suspended due to the COVID-19 pandemic. Prior to this, the leads had wrapped filming, with only two days of second unit filming left, which was initially scheduled to resume in mid-April, but was ultimately delayed to summer. Production resumed on July 23, 2020.

Release
The Prom had an awards-qualifying limited theatrical release on December 4, 2020, before being released digitally on December 11 by Netflix. It was the second-most watched film over its first weekend on the platform, before falling to tenth in its second week.

Critical reception
The website's critics consensus reads: "Through fiery songs and dance breaks, The Proms bonanza of glitz, glitter, and jazz hands might be enough to whisk audiences away." On Metacritic, the film has a weighted average score of 55 out of 100, based on 35 critics, indicating "mixed or average reviews".

Peter Bradshaw of The Guardian gave the film four out of five stars, writing that it is "so goofy that you just have to enjoy it". He went on to praise the musical numbers and the film's message of self-love. Brian Pruitt of USA Today also gave the film four stars out of four, calling it a "joyous adaptation". In AfterEllen, Claire Heuchan described the film as "a sweet homage to all the young lesbians and gays finding the courage to live and love authentically."  In his review for The Hollywood Reporter, David Rooney noted that "there’s something to be said for the wide reach of a Netflix feature that champions the rights of LGBTQ teens, sharing a message that’s easy to endorse even if the delivery tends to grate."

Of the opposing opinion, Mary Sollosi of Entertainment Weekly gave the film a "D" grade calling it "narratively sloppy, emotionally false, visually ugly, morally superior, and at least 15 minutes too long". Jesse Hassenger of The A.V. Club gave the film a "D+" describing it as "all-star, feel-good, zazzy nonsense".

James Corden's performance was criticized as offensive by some; Corden himself is straight while the character is gay and some said his performance perpetuated, and capitalized on, stereotypes of gay men.  Regarding his depiction of a flamboyant gay man, David Rooney wrote that "perhaps aware of the potential minefield for a straight actor playing a flaming gay stereotype, Corden channels the mannerisms without the joy."

Accolades

Novelization 
The UK and Commonwealth novelization rights of the film, written by Saundra Mitchell, were acquired by Penguin Random House’s editorial and media development director Holly Harris, who did a pre-emptive deal with Creative Artists Agency and William Morris Endeavor.

References

External links
 
 
 

2020 films
2020s English-language films
2020s high school films
2020 LGBT-related films
2020s musical comedy-drama films
American high school films
American musical comedy-drama films
American teen LGBT-related films
American films based on actual events
Musical films based on actual events
LGBT-related films based on actual events
Gay-related films
Lesbian-related films
LGBT-related coming-of-age films
LGBT-related musical comedy-drama films
Film productions suspended due to the COVID-19 pandemic
Films about anti-LGBT sentiment
Films about proms
Films about interracial romance
Films based on musicals
Films set in Indiana
Films set in New York City
Films shot in Los Angeles
Films directed by Ryan Murphy (writer)
Films produced by Bill Damaschke
Films produced by Ryan Murphy (writer)
English-language Netflix original films
LGBT-related controversies in film
Casting controversies in film
2020s American films